Scotland have played in every Rugby World Cup since the inaugural tournament in 1987.

Their best finish was fourth in 1991. In their semi-final on October 26, 1991, Scotland lost 6–9 to England at Murrayfield after Gavin Hastings missed a penalty almost in front of and a short distance from the posts. On October 30 Scotland lost the third-place play-off to New Zealand in Cardiff 13–6.

Since then they have qualified for the quarter-finals in every tournament except in 2011 and 2019, but have not qualified for the semi-finals.

In 2015 Scotland were defeated in the quarter-final match versus Australia following a number of refereeing decisions that provoked controversy.

In 2019, they were defeated in the pool stages by Ireland and hosts Japan, becoming the first Tier 1 team since Wales in 2007 to not qualify for the quarter-finals from a pool that only contained two Tier 1 teams.

By position

1987 New Zealand & Australia
Group matches

Quarter final

1991 UK, Ireland & France
Group matches

Quarter final

Semi final

Third-place play-off

1995 South Africa
Group matches

Quarter final

1999 Wales
Group matches

Quarter-final play-offs

Quarter final

2003 Australia
Group matches

Quarter final

2007 France
Group matches

Quarter final

2011 New Zealand
Group matches

2015 England 
Group matches

Quarter final

2019 Japan 
Group matches

Individual Records
Gavin Hastings is by far the most successful Scottish world cup player, and has gained a number of records.

Points

Key: App = Appearances. Con = conversions. Pen = penalties. Drop = drop goals.

Conversions
Most overall conversions in final stages
 Gavin Hastings  39 (1987–1995)

Penalty goals
Most penalties in a match
 Gavin Hastings  8 (v Tonga, 1995)

Overall record

RWC qualifying countries which Scotland has not played at the tournament include Canada, Wales and Namibia.

Miscellaneous

Draws
 20–20  (1987)

Nil points
 89–0   (1995)
 48–0  (1999)
 42–0  (2007)
 0–40  (2007)
 34–0  (2019)
 61–0  (2019)

Hosting

Scotland has never been the main host of the World Cup, but a number of Rugby World Cup games have been played in Scotland over the years.

1991 World Cup: Britain/Ireland/France
The 1991 Rugby World Cup final was played in England, pool and finals games were played all over the main five European nations. Pool B games, which involved European nations, Scotland and Ireland, had all their games in either Dublin or Edinburgh with one game being played in Ulster.

1999 World Cup: Wales
The 1999 World Cup was hosted by Wales with some games spread across Scotland, England, Ireland and France. All Pool A games were held in Scotland. Second round play-offs and the quarter-finals were held at a variety of European venues.

2007 World Cup: France
The 2007 competition was held in France, with some games played in Wales and Scotland. Two Pool C matches were held at Edinburgh's Murrayfield.

2015 World Cup: England

The host for the 2015 tournament was England, with no games played in Scotland.

See also 
 History of the Rugby World Cup
 National team appearances in the Rugby World Cup

References
 Davies, Gerald (2004) The History of the Rugby World Cup (Sanctuary Publishing Ltd,
 Farr-Jones, Nick, (2003). Story of the Rugby World Cup, Australian Post Corporation,

Rugby World Cup by nation
World Cup